Yu Song-jin (born 1964 or 1965) is a South Korean engineer detained for four-and-a-half months in 2009 by North Korea.

Detention
A native of Goseong, Gyeongsangnam-do, Yu was employed by Hyundai Asan in the Kaesong Industrial Complex. He was detained in March 30th 2009 after allegedly "slandering the system of the DPRK" and inciting a waitress to defect to South Korea.  He was freed in August 2009 after 137 days of captivity when Hyundai Group chairwoman Hyun Jeong-eun went to the North to negotiate for his release.

Legacy
The imprisonment is thought to be partially responsible for reducing the volume of trade between North Korea and South Korea in recent years.

References

1960s births
Living people
South Korean prisoners and detainees
Prisoners and detainees of North Korea
People from South Gyeongsang Province